The Marine Drive is a designated scenic route along Nova Scotia's Eastern Shore.  It closely follows the coast of the Atlantic Ocean and the Strait of Canso from the Canso Causeway to the junction of Route 322 and Highway 111 in  Dartmouth.

List of Highways
Trunk 7 
Trunk 16
Route 207
Route 211
Route 316
Route 322
Route 344

List of Communities

—Route 322
 Dartmouth
 Shearwater
 Eastern Passage
 Cow Bay
 Cole Harbour
— Route 207
 Upper Lawrencetown
 West Lawrencetown
 East Lawrencetown
 Three Fathom Harbour
 Seaforth 
 Grand Desert
 West Chezzetcook
— Trunk 7
 Porters Lake
 Head of Chezzetcook
 Gaetz Brook
 Musquodoboit Harbour
 Smiths Settlement
 Jeddore
 Salmon River Bridge
 Oyster Pond
 Lake Charlotte
 Beech Hill
 Ship Harbour
 East Ship Harbour
 Murphy Cove
 Pleasant Harbour
 Tangier
 Popes Harbour
 Spry Harbour
 Spry Bay
 Mushaboom
 Sheet Harbour
 Watt Section
 Beaver Harbour
 Port Dufferin
 West Quoddy
 East Quoddy
 Harrigan Cove
 Moosehead
 Moser River
 Necum Teuch
 Ecum Secum
 Marie Joseph
 Liscomb Mills
 Spanish Ship Bay
 Liscomb
 Goldenville
 Sherbrooke
— Route 211
 Stillwater
 Jordanville 
 Indian Harbour Lake
 Port Hilford
 Harpellville
 Port Bickerton 
 Isaac's Harbour North
— Route 316
 Goldboro
 Drum Head
 Seal Harbour
 Coddle's Harbour
 New Harbour West
 New Harbour East
 Tor Bay
 Larry's River
 Charlos Cove
 Cole Harbour
 Port Felix
 Whitehead
— Trunk 16
 Canso
 Hazel Hill
 Fox Island Main
 Half Island Cove
 Philips Harbour
 Queensport
 Halfway Cove
 Guysborough
 Boylston
— Route 344
 Manchester
 Port Shoreham
 Manassette Lake
 St. Francis Harbour
 Hadleyville
 Sand Point
 Middle Melford
 Steep Creek
 Pirate Harbour
 Mulgrave
 Auld's Cove

Parks
To see more, visit: Tourism on the Eastern Shore (Nova Scotia)

Port Shoreham Beach Provincial Park
Boylston Provincial Park
Tor Bay Provincial Park
Salsman Provincial Park 
Sherbrooke Provincial Park
Marie Joseph Provincial Park
Taylor Head Provincial Park
Spry Bay Provincial Park
Clam Harbour Beach Provincial Park
Martinique Beach Provincial Park
Porters Lake Provincial Park
Lawrencetown Beach Provincial Park
Rainbow Haven Beach Provincial Park
McNabs  and Lawlor's Island  Provincial Park
Bissett Road Trail
Cole Harbour-Lawrencetown Coastal Heritage Park System
Moser River Interpretive Trail
Musquodoboit Trail System
Moser River Seaside Park
Tangier Grand Lake Wilderness Area
West River Sheet Harbour Picnic Park
McCormick's Beach

Museums
To see more, visit: Tourism on the Eastern Shore (Nova Scotia)
Cole Harbour Heritage Farm Museum, Cole Harbour
Acadian House Museum/L'Acadie de Chezzetcook, West Chezzetcook
Musquodoboit Harbour Railway Museum, Musquodoboit Harbour
Fisherman’s Life Museum, Oyster Pond
Memory Lane Heritage Village, Lake Charlotte
Moose River Gold Mines Museum, Moose River Gold Mines
MacPhee House Museum, Sheet Harbour
Sherbrooke Village, Sherbrooke
Saint Mary's River Salmon Museum, Sherbrooke
Baird's Tradesman Museum, Aspen
Port Bickerton Lighthouse Interpretive Centre, Port Bickerton
Goldboro Interpretive Centre, Goldboro
Out of the Fog Lighthouse Museum, Half Island Cove
Canso Islands National Historic Site, Canso
Whitman House, Canso
The Old Courthouse Museum, Guysborough

References

Scenic travelways in Nova Scotia
Roads in Antigonish County, Nova Scotia
Roads in Halifax, Nova Scotia
Roads in Guysborough County, Nova Scotia